Alexandre-(Balthazard)-Laurent Grimod de La Reynière (20 November [September?] 1758 in Paris – 25 December 1837), was a lawyer by qualification who acquired fame during the reign of Napoleon for his sensual and public gastronomic lifestyle.  Son of Laurent Grimod de La Reynière, he inherited the family fortune on the death of his father, a fermier général, in 1793.  He was a member of the Société du Caveau.

Biography
Though his father built a stylish house in Paris with a garden that looked onto the bosquets of the Champs-Élysées and kept a great table, the younger Grimod had been born with deformed hands and was kept out of sight, a circumstance that developed his biting wit and dark sense of humour. The younger Grimod de La Reynière began his public career on his return from studies in Lausanne by collaborating in the review Journal des théâtres in 1777–78, continuing to write reviews of theatre, some of which he published himself, as Le Censeur Dramatique. During his parents' absence he gave grand dinner parties in the Hôtel Grimod de La Reynière, at one of which his father returned suddenly to find a pig dressed up and presiding at the table. The story made the rounds in Paris, and a breach with the family ensued, which culminated in a lettre de cachet that disinherited him and confined him to an abbey close to Nancy, where at the table of the father abbot he began to learn the art of good eating. He was a correspondent to the scandal chronicle, Correspondence secrète, politique et littéraire (1790) relating to Paris during the reign of Louis XVI, and formed a liaison with the actress Adèle Feuchère, who bore their love child in 1790.

Supported with a little money from his family, he had the idea of buying food directly from the producer, and selling it in a store at a set price; to make a living, he opened a shop in Lyon selling groceries, tools and other exotic commodities.  When he regained his liberty upon the death of his father in 1792, he returned to Paris and spread the activities of his "société Grimod et Cie", opening stores in other French cities. He reconciled with his mother, who was saved from the guillotine through his connections, and began a series of mock-funeral dinners.

As the first public critic of cooking, the first reviewer of the ambitious restaurants that cropped up in Paris in the later eighteenth century and flowered under the Napoleonic regime, his name is a by-word on a par with Brillat-Savarin and an equally rich source of quotations in French gastronomic literature through the eight volumes of his annual L'Almanach des gourmands, which he edited and published from 1803 to 1812. Gourmand still retained its sense of "gluttony", one of the Seven Deadly Sins, and Grimod's choice of the word, when "friand" more usually connoted a connoisseur of fine food and wine, was a conscious one and wholly in character; gourmand and gourmet first achieved their pleasant modern connotations in Grimod's Almanachs, which, among other innovations, were the first restaurant guides. The success of the Almanachs encouraged Grimod and his publishers to bring out the monthly Journal des Gourmandes et des Belles, which appeared for the first time in January 1806. Its editorial board consisted of the friends who met weekly for dinner at the Hôtel Grimod de La Reynière, those "Dîners du Vaudeville", composed of dishes sent round by the premier restaurants of Paris for judgment, and Grimod as host and presiding genius. His Manuel des amphitryons ("hosts") appeared in 1808. Sainte-Beuve called him the "Father of the table".

He inherited the family fortune at the death of his mother in 1812, married his devoted mistress, gave his own funeral to see who would come, then retired to the Château de Villiers-sur-Orge, near Paris.

Literature and Impact
Pascal Ory considers Alexandre Grimod to be "one of the founders of the modern French culture," grouping him with the Comte de Saint-Simon and Alexis de Tocqueville. He "reestablished order, hierarchy, and distinctions in the realm of good taste" through the publication of texts that helped to define the French food scene. While others at the time were focused more on art, literature and drama, Grimod opened the door to criticism of food and cookery, inventing the gastronomic guidebook (Almanach des Gourmands), the gastronomic treatise (Manuel des Amphitryons), and the gourmet periodical (Journal des Gourmands et des Belles). There was literature about food and eating before Grimod, but it was concerned only with technical aspects and recipes, while Grimod introduced the idea of food criticism.

Works
Alexandre Balthazar Laurent Grimod de La Reynière, Almanach des gourmands, Ed. Mercure de France, coll. Le Petit Mercure, 1 April 2003 online version
Alexandre Balthazar Laurent Grimod de La Reynière, Manuel des amphitryons, (1808) Ed. Métailié, 23 November 1995 A condensation of material from his Almanach. online version

Notes

Further reading
Ned Rival, Grimod de La Reynière Le Gourmand Gentilhomme, (Paris:Le Pré aux Clercs) 1983.
Giles MacDonogh, A Palate in Revolution: Grimod de la Reynière and the Almanach Des Gourmands (London:Robin Clark) 1987.
Gustave Desnoiresterres, Grimod de la Reynière et son Groupe, (Geneva: Slatkine) 1971. (First published Paris, Didier, 1877)
Robert Appelbaum, Dishing It Out: In Search of the Restaurant Experience (London: Reaktion) 2011.
Pascal Ory, "Gastronomy" in Pierre Nora, ed., Realms of Memory 2 (1997), p. 443-467.

External links

Olga Perla, "Stumps and knives", 2001
Tony Perrottet, "Liberty, Equality, Gastronomy: Paris via a 19th-Century Guide", 2009

1758 births
1838 deaths
Writers from Paris
19th-century French writers
French food writers
People imprisoned by lettre de cachet
French male non-fiction writers
French gastronomes